Cancer is the first full-length studio album by Australian metalcore band Confession, released in October 2009, through Resist Records.

The album was recorded at Sound House Studio in Adelaide, Australia and mixed by Roman Koester (The Red Shore guitarist) in Melbourne.

Track listing

Personnel
 Michael Crafter – lead vocals
 Dan Brown – lead guitar, bass, clean vocals
 Adam Harris – rhythm guitar
 Marcus Daniele – drums, percussion

Charts

References

Confession (band) albums
2009 albums
Resist Records albums